Eime may refer to:

 Andrew Eime (born 1971), Australian cricket player
 Casement Aerodrome, Ireland (IATA code EIME)
 Eime, Lower Saxony, Germany